The Fleetwings PQ-12 , company designation Fleetwings Model 36, was a 1940s American manned aerial-target designed and built by Fleetwings for the United States Army Air Corps.

Design and development
The PQ-12 was a single-engined monoplane with a  Lycoming O-435 piston engine. It had a fixed nose-wheel landing gear, twin vertical tails and an open-cockpit was provided for manned flight. Instead of the optional pilot a 500 lb (225 kg) bomb could be carried in the cockpit. The original prototype was cancelled but a modified variant was built followed by eight test aircraft, although an order for 40 production aircraft was placed it was subsequently cancelled.

Variants
XPQ-12
Prototype, not built.
XPQ-12A
Modified prototype, one-built.
YPQ-12A
Test and evaluation aircraft, eight-built.
PQ-12A
Production variant, 40 ordered but none were built.

Specifications (YPQ-12A)

References

Notes

Bibliography

 

Target drones of the United States
PQ-12
1940s United States military utility aircraft
Single-engined tractor aircraft
Low-wing aircraft